High Tech Enemies is a supplement published by Hero Games/I.C.E. in 1992 for the 4th edition of the superhero role-playing game Champions.

Contents
High Tech Enemies is a sourcebook featuring thiry-nine supervillains that use high levels of technology to supplement their skills.

Publication history
In 1981, Hero Games published the superhero role-playing game (RPG) Champions. By 1996, Hero Games was in financial difficulty, and was eventually taken over as a subsidiary of Iron Crown Enterprises (I.C.E.). In 1989, Hero Games/I.C.E. published a fourth edition of Champions. Two years later, Hero Games/I.C.E. released High Tech Enemies, a 96-page softcover book by Sean Patrick Fannon, with interior illustrations by Greg Smith and cover art by Storn Cook.

Reception
In the September 1993 edition of Dragon (Issue #197), Allen Varney was not a fan of this book, questioning the utility of yet another volume of Champions supervillains. He also found the content lacked creativity, commenting, "'My,' you say, 'how can this seemingly arbitrary and sterile premise give rise to a gallery of unique new foes, unlike any seen before?' We don’t find out. The villains in High Tech Enemies serve no new campaign function, and they conjure few novel ideas."

Reviews
White Wolf #36 (1993)

References

Champions (role-playing game) supplements
Role-playing game supplements introduced in 1992